Holley Hills Estate, also known as Holley Hills Farm, is a historic home located near Alum Creek, Lincoln County, West Virginia. The house was built about 1885, and is a two-story, oak-frame ell structure. It features a two-story front porch of five bays, the upper tier of which is enclosed in a balustrade, and topped by a hipped roof. Also on the property, are six contributing buildings, including a tool shed, a two-room cellar-like structure, a grain storage building, and a barn.

It was listed on the National Register of Historic Places in 1980.

References

Farms on the National Register of Historic Places in West Virginia
Greek Revival houses in West Virginia
Houses completed in 1885
Houses in Lincoln County, West Virginia
Houses on the National Register of Historic Places in West Virginia
National Register of Historic Places in Lincoln County, West Virginia